The Belarusian Independence Bloc is one of three major opposition coalitions in Belarus. The coalition was formed in 2009 as an alternative to the United Democratic Forces of Belarus (UDF). The group intention is to choose a single candidate  to defeat the incumbent Alexander Lukashenko, the president since 1994.

Member parties

There are 8 political parties in the Belarusian Independence Bloc of Belarus coalition, these are:

 Registered party:
Partyja BPF
 Party with registration status in progress:
Belarusian Christian Democracy
 Unregistered parties and movements:
Za svabodu
Malady Front
YCSU Young Democrats
Pravy Aljans
Young Belarus
Razam

New members are accepted in Belarusian Independence Bloc only if agreed by all existing members. That was a reason European Coalition was not admitted to Belarusian Independence Bloc

Participation in elections
At local elections in 2010 Belarusian Independence Bloc had over 500 candidates, significant campaigns were run by Aleś Łahviniec, Źmicier Babicki, Maksim Hubarevič, Taciana Kuǔšynava and a few others. From all of them, just 3 candidates of Belarusian Christian Democracy have won elections in their districts.

References

2009 establishments in Belarus
Belarusian opposition
Political parties established in 2009
Political party alliances in Belarus
Pro-European political parties in Belarus